Syed Kashif Shah (born 24 October 1993) is a field hockey player from Pakistan.

Career

2012
Shah was included in the squad for the 2012 Olympic Games in London, UK.

See also
Pakistan national field hockey team

References

External links

1993 births
Living people
Pakistani male field hockey players
Asian Games medalists in field hockey
Field hockey players at the 2014 Asian Games
Asian Games silver medalists for Pakistan
Medalists at the 2014 Asian Games
Field hockey players at the 2010 Summer Youth Olympics